Allan Grant (born 1 July 1973) is a Scottish former professional footballer.

Career

Grant began his career with junior side Maryhill. In the summer of 1998, he was part of the Junior revolution which swept through Clyde, being one of eleven players coming from the junior ranks to join the Bully Wee. He was a key figure in the team which won the Scottish Second Division championship in 2000.

In his final season at Clyde, he only played one game, due to injury. He left the club in the summer of 2002, and rejoined former club Maryhill. In 2003, he returned to the senior game for a season to join Stranraer. Grant then went back to Maryhill for a third spell before joining Bellshill athletic. Injuries forced him to retire from football in 2006.

Honours 
 Clyde
 Scottish Second Division: 1999–2000

 Stranraer
 Scottish Third Division: 2003–04

References

External links

1973 births
Footballers from Glasgow
Living people
Scottish footballers
Scottish Football League players
Clyde F.C. players
Stranraer F.C. players
Association football wingers
Scottish Junior Football Association players
Maryhill F.C. players
Bellshill Athletic F.C. players